Hypsoblennius gentilis, commonly known as the bay blenny, is a species of combtooth blenny found in the eastern-central Pacific Ocean.  This species grows to a length of  TL.

References

gentilis
Fish described in 1854